The Coastal Mountain Range (Silsilat al-Jibāl as-Sāḥilīyah) also called Al-Anṣariyyah or the Nusayri mountains is a mountain range in northwestern Syria running north–south, parallel to the coastal plain.

Name
Classically, this range was known as the Bargylus; a name mentioned by Pliny the Elder. The ) had its roots in the name of an ancient city-kingdom called Barga most probably located in the vicinity of the mountains; it was a city of the Eblaite Empire in the third millennium BC, and then a vassal kingdom of the Hittites, who named the mountain range after Barga.

In the medieval period were known as the Jabal Bahra after the Arab tribe of Bahra’. They are also sometimes known as the Nusayriyah Mountains or the Ansarieh mountains ( Jibāl an-Nuṣayriyah) or the Alawiyin Mountains ( Jibāl al-‘Alawīyin); both of these names refer to the Alawi ethnoreligious group which has traditionally lived there, though the former term is based on an antiquated label for the community that is now considered insulting.

Geography
The western slopes catch moisture-laden winds from the Mediterranean Sea and are thus more fertile and more heavily populated than the eastern slopes. The Orontes River flows north alongside the range on its eastern verge in the Ghab valley, a  longitudinal trench, and then around the northern edge of the range to flow into the Mediterranean. South of Masyaf there is a large northeast-southwest strike-slip fault which separates An-Nusayriyah Mountain from the coastal Lebanon Mountains and the Anti-Lebanon Mountains of Lebanon, in a feature known as the Homs Gap.

Between 1920 and 1936, the mountains formed parts of the eastern border of the Alawite State within the French Mandate for Syria and the Lebanon.

See also 
Turkmen Mountain

References

Mountain ranges of Syria
Hama Governorate
Homs Governorate